Tomás E. Salazar (born October 2, 1943 in Chapelle, New Mexico) is an American politician who served as a member of the New Mexico House of Representatives from January 15, 2013 to January 19, 2021.

Education
Salazar earned a Bachelor of Science degree in mathematics from New Mexico Highlands University, his Master of Arts in the mathematics from the University of Montana, and his PhD in mathematics from the University of New Mexico.

Elections
2012 Salazar challenged District 70 incumbent Democratic Representative Richard Vigil in the June 5, 2012 Democratic Primary, winning with 2,526 votes (55.3%) against Representative Vigil, and was unopposed for the November 6, 2012 General election, winning with 8,441 votes.

References

External links
Official page at the New Mexico Legislature

Tomas E. Salazar at Ballotpedia
Tomas E. Salazar at the National Institute on Money in State Politics

1943 births
Living people
Hispanic and Latino American state legislators in New Mexico
Democratic Party members of the New Mexico House of Representatives
New Mexico Highlands University alumni
People from San Miguel County, New Mexico
University of Montana alumni
University of New Mexico alumni
21st-century American politicians
People from Las Vegas, New Mexico